The Zotung people are one of the ethnic groups in Chin State in Myanmar also known as Burma. It is located in central and southern Chin State. Zotunges are a very distinct ethnic people in Burma. It is very difficult to get historical records of these ethnic people as they didn't have written languages for many years. However, their history can still be traced back as far as 900 AD since there are place names in traditional songs that reveal the time period they were composed. There are also local folk tale and legends. These people are from a Tibeto-Burman group and are familiar with all other Chin groups. They have their own written language which is unintelligible with other neighboring languages unless they learn it. These people called themselves "Zo" from the early times of their ancestors which can be traced back to 700 years ago. Neighboring tribes from the north and south called them Zo, and the Mara tribe from the west called them Azyu.

From 1933, their language was recorded using the Roman alphabet. It was called "Zoccaw" (Zo Script). Most of these people are farmers and prefer hunting animals for their meals like other Chin groups. In early history, the Zo Minphuins religion was known as Lawki or Sakhua. It was an animistic and pagan religion.

Traditions

Religion (Beihnaw)

The Zotung believed in Pachia (Pathian) as the supreme God. They also believed evil entities, known as Khozi (Khuazing), roamed around world. Khozis caused great mischief and would cause a person to be in a state of hnam. They appeased to the various Khozi through the high priests for their health, wealth, safety and the prosperity of the land through Khuarum services. However, they did not sacrifice to Pachia because he was believed to not cause harm or wickedness to humans. In recent years the believe in Khozi have slowly begun to vanished as more people convert to Christianity.

Death and Afterlife

The Zotung believed those that died as commoners went to Mitchi Khua, literally abode of the dead. Inside Mitchi Khua, there were two divisions. The first is Pucchi (Pulthi) where those that died a normal, non violent death went. Pucchi deaths were followed by village wide feasts and drinking. It was mourned by all the people and lasted 3 to 5 days. The other death is Sawchi (Sarthi) where those that died a violent, supernatural death or from a disease were categorized as. The relatives of the Sawchi were considered potentially dangerous and were avoided. The Sawchi corpse was immediately buried and no rites were performed. Only the closest of relatives were allowed to attend burial. When the Sawchi burial was over, the family killed a hen. They placed the blood of the hen and mixed in maize. They cried

Oh! The sickness inside me, be cleansed from the blood of the cock and maize. Let the sun set you also.

Counting forth from that day, they stayed isolated for 7 days then were they considered clean.

On the other hand, those that died an honourable death such as through battle, through death rites or hosted a great festival went to Hotheng. Though Mitchi Khua is less desired, it was not a place for eternal punishment but simply a permanent place for the dead to reside. Hotheng was a place for the ones with great wealth and riches. They feasted eternally and enjoyed themselves.

Between the three human realms was Lunglei Mual or Lunglei Hill. This was the check point for all the deceased. There lived the goddess Sawnnung that ruled over the realms. She led the dead to their rightful place. But first Sawnnung took the dead to a lake known as Rih Tui to drink from the lake. The water from Rih Tui was special. It made all that drank from it forget about their previous life so that they live happily in their new realm.

When the western missionaries entered Zoram, these people converted to Christianity starting around the 1900s.

Clothing

The Zotungs wore clothes like other Zo groups. For daily life, the men wore Angi (a cotton shirt), Boui (a large shawl), or were wrapped in fur. For special occasions the men were clothed with feathers, Cawnnak Boui, colourful Bouis, and jewellery. Women wore the Burmese longyi either with traditional patterns or plain ones. They also wore Angi and Boui.

Zo literature or Zo ccaw 

Although some people say that there is a legend saying that the first Chin script was written on leather or animal skin which was eaten away by a dog, there is no such kind of stories told by forefathers. Zoccaw (Zo script/Zo alphabet) was the first script introduced among these people using the "Roman Alphabet" in 1933 by Dr Siabawi Khua Ming who was one of the first persons to attend the mission school in Rezua opened in 1926. He himself termed this newly introduced letters as Zoccaw. This was the first Mission School established in Zoram (Zo land). Like many other ethnic languages, Zoccaw has been banned not to be taught officially in public school by the Myanmar government. For the Zo, Christian hymnals are the only resource available for self-study. However, most Zo people can read and write in Zoccaw.

Historical records are needed to confirm the identity of these people groups.

Natural disaster 2015 

Zotung (Chin) people are heavily affected by natural disaster that hits the country on July 19 and August 3, 2015. 364 houses were destroyed and all paddy fields and crops were destroyed. All roads and bridges are stopped by landslides. Zotung Relief Committee is responding to the urgent needs of the people.

References

Ethnic groups in Myanmar